Scapini is an Italian surname. Notable people with the surname include:

Franco Scapini (born 1962), Italian racing driver
Georges Scapini (1893–1976), French lawyer and politician
Mario Scapini
Matteo Scapini (born 1983), Italian footballer

See also
Rafinha (Rafael Scapini De Almeida)

Italian-language surnames